Valchedram Municipality is a frontier municipality (obshtina) in Montana Province, Northwestern Bulgaria, located along the right bank of Danube river in the Danubian Plain. It is named after its administrative centre - the town of Valchedram. The area borders on Romania beyond the Danube to the north.

Settlements 

Valchedram Municipality includes the following 11 places (towns are shown in bold):

Demography 
The following table shows the change of the population during the last four decades. Since 1992 Valchedram Municipality has comprised the former municipality of Zlatiya and the numbers in the table reflect this unification.

Religion 
According to the latest Bulgarian census of 2011, the religious composition, among those who answered the optional question on religious identification, was the following:

See also
Provinces of Bulgaria
Municipalities of Bulgaria
List of cities and towns in Bulgaria

References

External links
 Official website 

Municipalities in Montana Province